Elizabeth Vale is a suburb in the northern extent of Adelaide, South Australia. It was established in 1955. Its main roads are Main North Road to the east and John Rice Avenue which bisects the suburb. The southern boundary is the northern bank of the Little Para River.

Elizabeth Vale has two hospitals, the Lyell McEwin Hospital, a public teaching hospital, and the private Central Districts Hospital.

Demographics

The 2006 Census by the Australian Bureau of Statistics counted 3,667 persons in the suburb of Elizabeth Vale on census night. Of these, 1,766 (48.2%) were male and 1,901 (51.8%) were female.

The majority of residents 2,268 (61.7%) were Australian born, with 598 (16.3%) born in England.

The age distribution of Elizabeth Vale residents is similar to that of the greater Australian population. 69.8% of residents were aged 25 or over in 2006, compared to the Australian average of 66.5%; and 30.3% were younger than 25 years, compared to the Australian average of 33.5%.

See also
 City of Playford
 List of Adelaide suburbs

References

External links
Playford Council

Suburbs of Adelaide